Matthias Dießl  (born 6 December 1975) is a German politician, representative of the Christian Social Union of Bavaria. He is the District Administrator for the rural district of Fürth since 2008.

See also
List of Bavarian Christian Social Union politicians

References

Christian Social Union in Bavaria politicians
21st-century German politicians
1975 births
Living people